Matthew Shiels (born 13 September 2000) is a Scottish professional footballer who plays for Hamilton Academical, as a left back.

Early and personal life
Shiels was born in Glasgow. His paternal grandparents were from Donegal in Ireland.

Club career
After playing youth football for Rangers, and spending loan spells at Edinburgh City, Dumbarton and Clyde, as well as in the United States with Orange County SC, Shiels signed for  Hamilton Academical in summer 2021.

International career
Having previously been called up for Scotland at under-17 level, in November 2017 he was called up to the Republic of Ireland under-18 squad, making his debut on 9 November.

He also played with the Republic of Ireland under-19s, before later reverting his international allegiance back to Scotland, playing ten games for the Scotland under-19 team.

Playing style
Shiels plays primarily as a left back, but also played as a left winger and striker for Rangers.

References

2000 births
Living people
Scottish footballers
Rangers F.C. players
F.C. Edinburgh players
Dumbarton F.C. players
Clyde F.C. players
Orange County SC players
Hamilton Academical F.C. players
Scottish Professional Football League players
Association football fullbacks
Scottish expatriate footballers
Scottish expatriates in the United States
Expatriate soccer players in the United States
Scotland youth international footballers
Republic of Ireland association footballers
Republic of Ireland youth international footballers
Scottish people of Irish descent